Wedron is an unincorporated community in Dayton Township, LaSalle County, Illinois, United States. The ZIP code is 60557.

Demographics

References

External links
 Wedron Community Website

Unincorporated communities in Illinois
Unincorporated communities in LaSalle County, Illinois
Ottawa, IL Micropolitan Statistical Area